The Hill Peaks are a small group of peaks  southwest of Mount Dane in the western part of Radford Island, lying in the Sulzberger Ice Shelf off the coast of Marie Byrd Land, Antarctica. The peaks were probably first observed by the Byrd Antarctic Expedition (1928–30) on an aerial flight of December 5, 1929, and were named by the Advisory Committee on Antarctic Names for Joseph Hill, Jr., a mechanic and driver with the 1933–35 Byrd expedition.

References

Mountains of Marie Byrd Land